The 1994 Cheltenham Council election took place on 5 May 1994 to elect members of Cheltenham Borough Council in Gloucestershire, England. One third of the council was up for election and the Liberal Democrats stayed in overall control of the council. For the first time ever in Cheltenham, the Conservatives failed to win a single seat up for election.

After the election, the composition of the council was
Liberal Democrat 25
Conservative 10
People Against Bureaucracy 3
Labour 2
Independent 1

Election result

Ward results

References

Cheltenham
Cheltenham Borough Council elections